Shearn is an English-language surname and occasional given name. People with the name include:

Surname
 Amy Shearn (born 1979), American writer
 Clarence J. Shearn (1869–1953), American lawyer and judge
 Harry Shearn (1892–1951), Australian politician
 Nicola Shearn (born 1966), British swimmer
 Tom Shearn (born 1977), American baseball player

Given name
 Shearn Moody, Jr. (1933–1996), American entrepreneur